The Emperors Club may refer to:

The Emperor's Club, 2002 film
Emperors Club VIP, the prostitution ring made famous in the Eliot Spitzer prostitution scandal